Psophometric voltage is a circuit noise voltage measured with a psophometer that includes a CCIF-1951 weighting network. 

"Psophometric voltage" should not be confused with "psophometric emf," i.e., the emf in a generator or line with 600 Ω internal resistance. For practical purposes, the psophometric emf is twice the corresponding psophometric voltage. 

Psophometric voltage readings, V, in millivolts, are commonly converted to dBm(psoph) by dBm(psoph) = 20 log10V – 57.78.

References

Electrical parameters
Noise (electronics)
Telecommunications engineering